V. V. Swaminathan has been an Indian politician & statesman since 1940. He was the first DMK Municipal chairman of Chidambaram municipality, popular Advocate of South Arcot dt, imprisoned during anti Hindi Agitation, elected to Rajya Sabha from Tamil Nadu in 1972 as an undivided  DMK MP and second term as an AIADMK MP, elected twice as MLA from Bhuvana giri constituency TN(India)| as an Anna Dravida Munnetra Kazhagam candidate in 1980 and in 1984]. He was inducted into cabinet as minister for handlooms in MGR cabinet and later MGR entrusted him with 11 more key portfolios viz prohibition & excise, electricity, Hindu Religious Endowment & charities,
Planning, forest & environment, Registration, Tourism, Milk & Animal husbandry, Archaeology. After demise of MGR he was inducted as a senior minister in Janaki M G Ramachandran's cabinet with 13 portfolios. wakf board was the additional portfolio.

References 

All India Anna Dravida Munnetra Kazhagam politicians
Possibly living people
Year of birth missing
Tamil Nadu MLAs 1985–1989